G77 or G-77 may refer to:

 The old g77 FORTRAN compiler of GCC which has been replaced by GNU Fortran since release 4.0.
 Group of 77, a loose coalition of developing nations designed to promote its members' collective economic interests and create an enhanced joint negotiating capacity in the United Nations.